The eudicots, Eudicotidae, or eudicotyledons are a clade of flowering plants mainly characterized by having two seed leaves upon germination. The term derives from Dicotyledons.

Traditionally they were called tricolpates or non-magnoliid dicots by previous authors. The botanical terms were introduced in 1991 by evolutionary botanist James A. Doyle and paleobotanist Carol L. Hotton to emphasize the later evolutionary divergence of tricolpate dicots from earlier, less specialized, dicots.

Numerous familiar plants are eudicots, including many common food plants, trees, and ornamentals. Some common and familiar eudicots include sunflower, dandelion, forget-me-not, cabbage, apple, buttercup, maple, and macadamia. Most leafy trees of midlatitudes also belong to eudicots, with notable exceptions being magnolias and tulip trees which belong to the magnoliids, and Ginkgo biloba, which is not an angiosperm.

Description
The close relationships among flowering plants with tricolpate pollen grains was initially seen in morphological studies of shared derived characters. These plants have a distinct trait in their pollen grains of exhibiting three colpi or grooves paralleling the polar axis. 

Later molecular evidence confirmed the genetic basis for the evolutionary relationships among flowering plants with tricolpate pollen grains and dicotyledonous traits. The term means "true dicotyledons", as it contains the majority of plants that have been considered dicots and have characteristics of the dicots. One of the genetic traits which defines the eudicots is the duplication of DELLA protein‐encoding genes in their most recent common ancestor. The term "eudicots" has subsequently been widely adopted in botany to refer to one of the two largest clades of angiosperms (constituting over 70% of the angiosperm species), monocots being the other. The remaining angiosperms include magnoliids and what are sometimes referred to as basal angiosperms or paleodicots, but these terms have not been widely or consistently adopted, as they do not refer to a monophyletic group.

Taxonomy
The earlier name for the eudicots is tricolpates, a name which refers to the grooved structure of the pollen. Members of the group have tricolpate pollen, or forms derived from it. These pollens have three or more pores set in furrows called colpi. In contrast, most of the other seed plants (that is the gymnosperms, the monocots and the paleodicots) produce monosulcate pollen, with a single pore set in a differently oriented groove called the sulcus. The name "tricolpates" is preferred by some botanists to avoid confusion with the dicots, a nonmonophyletic group.

The name "eudicots" (plural) is used in the APG systems (from APG system, of 1998, to APG IV system, of 2016) for classification of angiosperms. It is applied to a clade, a monophyletic group, which includes most of the (former) dicots.

"Tricolpate" is a synonym for the "Eudicot" monophyletic group, the "true dicotyledons" (which are distinguished from all other flowering plants by their tricolpate pollen structure). The number of pollen grain furrows or pores helps classify the flowering plants, with eudicots having three colpi (tricolpate), and other groups having one sulcus.

Pollen apertures are any modification of the wall of the pollen grain. These modifications include thinning, ridges and pores, they serve as an exit for the pollen contents and allow shrinking and swelling of the grain caused by changes in moisture content. The elongated apertures/ furrows in the pollen grain are called colpi (singular colpus), which, along with pores, are a chief criterion for identifying the pollen classes.

Subdivisions
The eudicots can be divided into two groups: the basal eudicots and the core eudicots. Basal eudicot is an informal name for a paraphyletic group. The core eudicots are a monophyletic group. A 2010 study suggested the core eudicots can be divided into two clades, Gunnerales and a clade called Pentapetalae, comprising all the remaining core eudicots.

The Pentapetalae can be then divided into three clades:
 Dilleniales
 superrosids consisting of  Saxifragales and rosids (the APG IV system includes the Vitales in the rosids)
 superasterids consisting of Santalales, Berberidopsidales, Caryophyllales and asterids

This division of the eudicots is shown in the following cladogram:

The following is a more detailed breakdown according to APG IV, showing within each clade and orders:

 clade Eudicots
 order Ranunculales
 order Proteales
 order Trochodendrales
 order Buxales
 clade Core eudicots
 order Gunnerales
 order Dilleniales
 clade Superrosids
 order Saxifragales
 clade Rosids
 order Vitales
 clade Fabids
 order Fabales
 order Rosales
 order Fagales
 order Cucurbitales
 order Oxalidales
 order Malpighiales
 order Celastrales
 order Zygophyllales
 clade Malvids
 order Geraniales
 order Myrtales
 order Crossosomatales
 order Picramniales
 order Malvales
 order Brassicales
 order Huerteales
 order Sapindales
 clade Superasterids
 order Berberidopsidales
 order Santalales
 order Caryophyllales
 clade Asterids
 order Cornales
 order Ericales
 clade Campanulids
 order Aquifoliales
 order Asterales
 order Escalloniales
 order Bruniales
 order Apiales
 order Dipsacales
 order Paracryphiales
 clade Lamiids
 order Solanales
 order Lamiales
 order Vahliales
 order Gentianales
 order Boraginales
 order Garryales
 order Metteniusales
 order Icacinales

References

Bibliography

Eudicots in Stevens, P. F. (2001 onwards). Angiosperm Phylogeny Website. Version 7, May 2006.

External links

 
 Eudicots, Tree of Life Web Project
Dicots  Plant Life Forms

 
Plant unranked clades
Early Cretaceous plants
Extant Early Cretaceous first appearances